Beyond Live (commonly stylized as Beyond LIVE) is an online live concert streaming service and concert series first established in April 2020 by South Korean entertainment company SM Entertainment in partnership with Naver. It is the first paid concert streaming service in the world that delivers full-scaled live online concert aided by technology such as augmented reality and with real-time interactions between artists and live audience enabled. On its establishment, the platform has been regarded by global media as a relevant response in substituting traditional concerts during the ongoing COVID-19 pandemic. The first live concert of the Beyond Live series was headlined by South Korean boy supergroup SuperM with the concert titled SuperM: Beyond the Future on April 26, 2020; the live concert recorded over 75,000 virtual tickets sold, playing to real-time audience from 109 countries. In August 2020, JYP Entertainment joined with SM Entertainment to create Beyond Live Corporation, a joint venture operating and expanding the Beyond Live platform. It was launched on December 23, 2021. Since its creation, multiple artists from SM and JYP have delivered full-length live online concerts within Beyond Live series, and other K-pop entertainment enterprises started to produce virtual live concerts in similar format.

Background, technology and media reaction
By April 2020, it was announced South Korea's largest entertainment company SM Entertainment and South Korean Internet search platform and media corporation Naver had signed a Memorandum of Understanding (MOU) with purpose to expand the reach of concerts to global audience. The joint effort lead to the creation of Beyond Live, a series of online live concerts which, according to SM, was formed in order to combine "SM's content development capabilities with Naver's platform technology." On April 20, SM Entertainment released a trailer on their official YouTube channel announcing the upcoming series of live concerts, with the first live show to be headlined by K-pop boy group SuperM. Initially, Beyond Live was scheduled with four concert dates in April and May 2020. The concerts are hosted on the Vlive application and made available to audience from over 200 countries and territories. Subtitles in different languages are made available to live audience. Together with real-time access to the live concert, the paid audience have rights to on-demand viewing of the concerts afterwards.

"Beyond Live" constitutes a real-time customized performance service for full-length and full-sized arena live concert in which there are no in-person audience, which is considered as different from prior commonly used methods of broadcasting a performance online from home or broadcasting an existing footage from previous concerts. The format and design of the concert is optimized for the online audience with the aid of technology including augmented reality (AR) technology, three-dimensional backdrop graphics, live sync camera walk, and digital communication to enable real-time interactions (two-way) between performers and the online audience. Specifically, Beyond Live concerts are credited for implementing augmented reality graphics to transform the stage to fit each performance, as well as varying camera shots arranged differently from normal concert broadcasts. Artists perform on a stage before "a backdrop of screens and visuals [...] directed in real-time" by camera operators personnel.  Real-time communication and Q&A sessions between artists and online audience are conducted via video calls.

Global media outlets like Forbes, Rolling Stone, and ABC News have commended the platform as a viable and timely alternative to traditional in-person concerts, which were being cancelled around the world as a result of the ongoing COVID-19 pandemic, as well as ensuing rules on social distancing and restricted travels enforced in various countries. The Beyond Live concert series is also regarded as a digital innovation created to foster interactions between artists and the "technical-savvy audience." In addition, Forbes remarked that, even if the impact of the COVID-19 pandemic is to be ignored, the concert streaming service still addresses a prevalent need from international K-pop fans located across regions where K-pop acts rarely travel to, highlighting that for areas outside certain countries in Asia, the Americas, Europe, and Australia, fans lack the chance for in-person concerts and would need to turn to online alternatives regardless.

On August 4, 2020, SM Entertainment and JYP Entertainment announced the establishment of Beyond Live Corporation, a joint company for virtual concerts. It was formed to grow Beyond LIVE into a global online concert brand by strengthening global joint business development by adding synergy between SM's content production capabilities and Naver's technology.

Shows and reception

Piracy concerns
Illegal live-streaming has been identified as a potential concern. Before the first concert in the series, the SuperM: Beyond the Future show, SM Entertainment had warned of legal actions against copyright violation streaming. However, Forbes noted it is possible that many people had attempted to stream the first live show via unofficial sources.

References

External links
 

2020 concerts
2021 concerts
2022 concerts
K-pop concerts
SM Town
JYP Entertainment
Naver Corporation
Live streaming services
Multilingual websites
South Korean entertainment websites